Piast may refer to:

Buildings and organisations
 Piast Brewery, a defunct brewery, located in Wrocław
 Piast Canal, a canal that connects the Oder Lagoon with the Baltic Sea
 Piast's Castle, castle in Gliwice
 Piast Coal Mine
See also: 1981 strike at the Piast Coal Mine in Bieruń
 Piast Institute, a national research and policy center for Polish and Polish-American affairs based in Hamtramck, Michigan
 Stadion Piast, the stadium of Piast Gliwice

History
 Piast dynasty, the first historical ruling dynasty of Poland
 Piast the Wheelwright, founder of the Piast dynasty
 Silesian Piast dynasty, rulers of the Duchies of Silesia, which resulted from numerous divisions of the original Duchy of Silesia established in 1138 under the Silesian Piasts
 Ziemowit Piast, son of Piast the Wheelwright

Politics
 Chjeno-Piast, an unofficial (yet common) name of a past coalition of Polish political parties formed in 1923
 Piast Concept, a political idea of Polish state based on its initial territories under the Piast dynasty
 Polish People's Party "Piast" (1913–31), a former political party in Poland
 Polish People's Party "Piast" (founded 2006), a political party in Poland

Sports teams
 Piast Cieszyn
 Piast Chęciny
 Piast Gliwice
 Piast Nowa Ruda

Other
 Piast Eagle, coat of arms of Poland
 Piast, a beer brewed by the Okocim Brewery, previously by the Piast Brewery